Peter Morris (born June 29, 1955) is a Canadian former professional ice hockey player who played in the World Hockey Association (WHA). Drafted in the sixth round of the 1975 NHL Amateur Draft by the Pittsburgh Penguins, Morris opted to play in the WHA after being selected by the Edmonton Oilers in the second round of the 1975 WHA Amateur Draft. He played parts of two WHA seasons for the Oilers. His father, Frank Morris, played in the Canadian Football League.

Career statistics

References

External links

1955 births
Living people
Canadian ice hockey left wingers
Edmonton Oilers (WHA) draft picks
Edmonton Oilers (WHA) players
Ice hockey people from Edmonton
Pittsburgh Penguins draft picks
Springfield Indians players
Victoria Cougars (WHL) players
Western International Hockey League players